For the Kids may refer to:
The motto of Penn State Dance Marathon, often abbreviated "FTK"
...For the Kids, by Gym Class Heroes
For the Kids (2002 album), a 2002 album by various artists
For the Kids (EP), by John Rich